Alma Ranchera (Ranchera Soul) is the title of the last studio album released by Spanish singer Rocío Dúrcal on 14 September 2004 by BMG and RCA. Produced by Memo Gil and Carlos Cabral "Junior", the album is a tribute to ranchera music.

Alma Ranchera features eleven cover versions of classic songs written by famous Mexican composers, including José Alfredo Jiménez, Cuco Sánchez, José Ángel Espinoza, Rubén Fuentes, and Tomás Méndez. It also includes a previously unreleased song, "Vete A Volar", which was written by Jaime Flores, Luis Carlos Monroy and Raúl Ornelas. In 2005, the album was nominated for the Grammy Award for Best Mexican/Mexican-American Album and the Latin Grammy Award for Best Ranchero Album.

Track listing

Awards

Credits and personnel 
Musicians
 Rocío Dúrcal – (Vocals)
 Group "Esto es México" – (Chorus of mariachi)
 Claudia Angelica and Sorrel – (Vocals)
 Ariadne Gobera – (Vocals)
 Jair Alcalá – (Accordion)
 Lupe Alfaro – (Vihuela)
 Carlos Cabral, "Junior" – (Lead Guitar, Keyboards)
 Dave Rivera – (Guitarrón)
 Paco Rosas – (Acoustic guitar and Arrangements)
 Fernando de Santiago – (Vocals, Rhythm Guitar, Vihuela, Songs and Arrangements)
 Marco Antonio Santiago – (Guitar)
 Javier Serrano – (Trumpet and Bugle)
 Moses Tlaxcaltécatl – (Flute)

Production
 Producers: Memo Gil and Carlos Cabral "Junior".
 Arrangers: Manuel Cazares.
 Programming, Audio Mixing and Arrangements: Memo Gil.
 Arrangers: Rigoberto Alfaro.
 Audio Mix: Isaiah G. Asbún.
 Mastering: Ron Boustead.
 Latin Percussion: Armando Montiel.
 Musical Director: Antonio Morales.
 Session string: Enrique Ramos.
 Programming and Arrangements: Pancho Ruiz.
 Percussion Symphony: Francisco Sanchez.
 Copies of scores: Oscar Wilde.
 Recorded at: La Bodega, Mexico, D.F. and Torres Sound, Madrid, Spain.
 Label: RCA, BMG Music.
 Manufactured and Distributed by: BMG Music, RCA Records.

References

2004 albums
Rocío Dúrcal albums
Ranchera albums